is the highest mountain on Okushiri Island in Okushiri, Hokkaidō, Japan. The name of the mountain is derived from the Ainu word kamui, meaning deity or god.

References
 Geographical Survey Institute

Mountains of Hokkaido